Wayne Rivers (born February 1, 1942) is a Canadian former professional ice hockey player. He played 108 games in the National Hockey League and 357 games in the World Hockey Association.

During the 1977–78 season, Rivers coached the San Francisco Shamrocks to win the Pacific Hockey League championship.

Career statistics

Regular season and playoffs

References

External links

1942 births
Living people
Baltimore Clippers players
Boston Bruins players
Buffalo Bisons (AHL) players
Canadian ice hockey right wingers
Detroit Red Wings players
Hershey Bears players
New York Rangers players
New York Raiders players
New York Golden Blades players
Jersey Knights players
Ice hockey people from Ontario
St. Louis Blues players
San Diego Mariners players
Sportspeople from Hamilton, Ontario
Springfield Kings players